Lonely Women was a radio soap opera in the United States during World War II. It "told of women separated from their men by war." The 15-minute program, which was sponsored by General Mills, ran one season on NBC, with its first episode broadcast June 29, 1942."

Creator 

Lonely Women was conceived and written by Irna Phillips, a prolific producer of radio soap operas. Her entry on the Jewish Women's Archive website notes her contributions to the genre as follows:Working with a full-time secretary and staff of writers and researchers, Phillips produced five daytime serials during the early 1940s. Among her most popular radio soap operas were The Guiding Light, Woman in White, The Right to Happiness, Lonely Women, and The ‘New’ Today’s Children. Known for her trademark cliff-hangers, the use of organ music to create moods, and the “crossover” (when characters from one show appeared on another), she was among the first scriptwriters to utilize the amnesia victim and the murder trial. Shunning sensationalism, Phillips preferred to focus on real-life families as they coped with such socially significant issues as juvenile delinquency during World War II, the adjustments of returning war veterans, adultery, adoption, and divorce. In contrast with other radio soap operas, which typically endorsed traditional visions of domesticity and femininity, Phillips’s serials frequently conveyed the complexities of modern women’s choices.

Cast 

The show's main characters were Fifth Avenue model Marilyn Larimore (played by Betty Lou Gerson) and lovesick secretary Judith Clark (played by Barbara Luddy). Although the cast was originally all-female, men were added later." Additional characters and the actor or actress who played the part were as follows:

See also 

List of radio soaps

References

External links 
 Jewish Women's Archive: Irna Phillips

American radio soap operas
1940s American radio programs
American radio dramas
NBC radio programs